Hospital Diary is a 2018 Burmese drama television series. It aired on MRTV, from September 27, to December 27, 2018, on every Wednesday, Thursday and Friday at 19:15 for 40 episodes.

Cast
Aung Myint Myat as Dr. Naung Yoe
Swan Htet as Dr. Htin Shar Aung
Myat Thu Aung as Dr. Kyaw Thu
Thura Htoo as Dr. Zaw Lin
Nwe Darli Tun as Than Lwin Cho
Khin Thazin as Dr. Pone Nyet Tay Zar
Gon Yi Aye Kyaw as Dr. Akari

References

Burmese television series
MRTV (TV network) original programming